The 1983 FIFA World Youth Championship was the fourth edition FIFA World Youth Championship tournament, hosted from 2 June to 19 June 1983 in seven venues in Mexico — Guadalajara, Irapuato, León, Mexico City, Monterrey, Puebla and Toluca — where a total of 32 matches were played. Brazil U20 defeated Argentina, 1–0, at Mexico City's Azteca Stadium to claim its inaugural tournament title of five.

This edition still retains the record average daily attendance of 36,099 in the tournament's history. This test of Mexico's capacity and capability to host a major FIFA tournament was recognized in May to host the 1986 FIFA World Cup.

Qualification

1.Teams that made their debut.

Squads
For a list of all squads that played in the final tournament, see 1983 FIFA World Youth Championship squads.

Group stage

Group A

Group B

Group C

Group D

Knockout stage

Quarter-finals

Semi-finals

Third place play-off

Final

Result

Awards

All-Star XI

Goalkeeper:  Luis Islas
Sweeper:  Neale Cooper
Left defender:  Kim Pan-keun
Central defender:  Paul McStay
Right defender:  Fabián Basualdo
Left midfielder:  Roberto Oscar Zárate
Central midfielder:  Gerald Vanenburg
Right midfielder:  Geovani Faria da Silva
Left forward:  Paul Moreno
Central forward:  Bebeto
Right forward:  Mauricinho

Goalscorers

Geovani of Brazil won the Golden Shoe award for scoring six goals. In total, 91 goals were scored by 61 different players, with only one of them credited as own goals.

6 goals
 Geovani
5 goals
 Joachim Klemenz
4 goals
 Jorge Luis Gabrich
3 goals

 Roberto Oscar Zárate
 Stanislav Dostal
 Shin Yon-ho
 Carlos Aguilera

2 goals

 Gilmar Popoca
 Marinho Ra
 Vlastimil Kula
 Marco van Basten
 Mario Been
 Adrian Szczepański
 Marek Leśniak
 Jim Dobbin
 Kim Jong-boo
 Rubén Sosa

1 goal

 Claudio García
 Jorge Borelli
 Julio César Gaona
 Mario Vanemerak
 Oscar Acosta
 Oscar Dertycia
 Fabio Incantalupo
 Frank Farina
 Jim Patikas
 Rodney Brown
 Bebeto
 Dunga
 Duan Ju
 Guo Yijun
 Li Huayun
 Liu Haiguang
 Mai Chao
 Karel Kula
 Miroslav Hirko
 Pavel Karoch
 Leopold Didi
 Lucien Kassy
 Marcelino Bernal
 Martin Reyna
 Henk Duut
 Tarila Okoronwanta
 Mirosław Myśliński
 Wiesław Krauze
 Wiesław Wraga
 Wojciech Gorgoń
 Paul McStay
 Steve Clarke
 Kim Chong-kon
 Lee Kee-keun
 No In-woo
 Fanas Salimov
 Hennadiy Litovchenko
 Oleh Protasov
 George Gelnovatch
 Hugo Pérez
 Jeff Hooker
 Jorge Martínez
 José Zalazar

Own goals
 Mikhail Agapov (playing against Brazil)

Final ranking

Notes

External links
FIFA World Youth Championship Mexico 1983 , FIFA.com
RSSSF > FIFA World Youth Championship > 1983
FIFA Technical Report (Part 1) and (Part 2)
 All Matches of the Brazilian Soccer Team
 Todos os Jogos da Seleção Brasileira de Futebol

FIFA World Youth Championship
International association football competitions hosted by Mexico
Fifa World Youth Championship, 1983
FIFA World Youth Championship
1982–83 in Mexican football
June 1983 sports events in North America
June 1983 events in Mexico